The 1878 North Lancashire by-election was held on 8 April 1878.  The by-election in the North Lancashire constituency was fought due to the incumbent Conservative MP, Frederick Stanley later known as Lord Stanley, becoming Secretary of State for War and in the normal practice of the time, he vacated the seat in his appointment to the Cabinet, to be returned unopposed.

References

External links

1878 elections in the United Kingdom
1878 in England
1870s in Lancashire
By-elections to the Parliament of the United Kingdom in Lancashire constituencies
Unopposed ministerial by-elections to the Parliament of the United Kingdom in English constituencies